Lee Lien-chuan is a Taiwanese politician. He is currently the Vice Minister of Culture since September 2016.

Education
Lee obtained his bachelor's and master's degree in economics from Fu Jen Catholic University and National Chengchi University respectively.

See also
 Culture of Taiwan

References

Living people
Fu Jen Catholic University alumni
National Chengchi University alumni
Taiwanese Ministers of Culture
Year of birth missing (living people)